Archbishop Joseph (born Al-Zehlaoui on November 2, 1950) was the Metropolitan of the Antiochian Orthodox Christian Archdiocese of North America from July 3, 2014 to September 17, 2022. He was preceded by Metropolitan Philip Saliba. From September 12, 2004, to his election as Metropolitan in 2014, Joseph Al Zehlaoui was the bishop of the Holy Diocese of Los Angeles and the West for the Antiochian Orthodox Christian Archdiocese of North America. 
In connection with allegations of sexual misconduct, Archbishop Joseph presented the Holy Synod of Antioch with a letter requesting to retire on September 17, 2022. His resignation was effective immediately, and on September 23, 2022, Patriarch John X announced his replacement with a temporary operating committee until a new Metropolitan Archbishop of America is elected.

Early years
Joseph G. Al-Zehlaoui or Joseph Zehlaoui (in Arabic جوزيف زحلاوي) was born on November 2, 1950, in Damascus, Syria to Georgi and Mathil (Baghdan) Al-Zehlaoui. After receiving his elementary education at the St. John of Damascus and Al-Assiyeh schools in Damascus, and his secondary education at Balamand Monastery in Koura, Northern Lebanon, he studied philosophy at Lebanese University in Beirut and theology, languages and music at the Aristotle University of Thessaloniki in Greece. He is fluent in Arabic, English, and Greek.

He was ordained to the diaconate while a student in Salonica, in December 1976. Subsequently, he was ordained to the priesthood by Patriarch Ignatius IV, at St. Mary Cathedral in Damascus in December, 1980. As a deacon, he served parishes in Thessaloniki. As a priest, he was dean of St. Mary Cathedral of Damascus, and overseer of the Holy Cross Church and other parishes in the suburbs of Damascus. In 1983, he pastored the Antiochian Orthodox followers living in London, England, and, in 1986, the Antiochian Orthodox community living in Cyprus.

His election to the episcopate was on May 5, 1991, and the consecration was on June 30, 1991, in the Holy Cathedral of the Patriarchate in Damascus with the title Bishop of Katana, Syria.

During his clerical ministry, he served as General Supervisor and Professor of Religious Education at the Al-Assiyeh Orthodox College and supervised the Patriarchal headquarters in Damascus. Besides being the Patriarchal Assistant during the past several years, Bishop Joseph served as the secretary to the Holy Synod of Antioch, Editor-in-Chief of the Patriarchal Bulletin and participated in several theological conferences in Greece, Texas, and Australia.

Service in the United States

At the request of Metropolitan Philip (Saliba) of New York, Al-Zehlaoui was selected by the Holy Synod of Antioch on January 24, 1995, to be an auxiliary bishop for the Antiochian Orthodox Christian Archdiocese of North America.

Starting September 12, 2004, he was appointed as the first bishop of the Holy Diocese of Los Angeles and the West enthroned by Metropolitan Philip and the Local Holy Synod of the Archdiocese.

Following the death of Metropolitan Philip Saliba, the prior Antiochian Orthodox metropolitan (1966–March 19, 2014), the Holy Synod of the Greek Orthodox Patriarchate of Antioch and All the East convened on July 3, 2014, at the Our Lady of Balamand Patriarchal Monastery in Northern Lebanon and elected him at its meeting as metropolitan of North America.

Allegations of Sexual Misconduct
On August 25, 2022, the Antiochian Orthodox Christian Archdiocese of North America posted a statement on their website announcing that an independent legal team is investigating an accusation claiming Metropolitan Joseph had violated the canons of the church, particularly with regard to sexual misconduct. On August 28, 2022, Patriarch John X of Antioch both acknowledged the accusations and assured the church that appropriate actions would be taken quickly. Metropolitan Joseph issued a message to the American Archdiocese for the Ecclesiastical New Year but had made no public acknowledgement of the accusations as of September 1, 2022. As a result of the controversy, on September 17, 2022, Archbishop Joseph announced his request to retire as Metropolitan, while continuing to deny the allegations.

Title
Al-Zehlaoui's former title was His Eminence, the Most Reverend Joseph, Archbishop of New York and Metropolitan of All North America, Primate.

References

External links
http://orthodoxwiki.org/Joseph_%28Al-Zehlaoui%29_of_Los_Angeles

1950 births
Antiochian Orthodox Metropolitans of All North America
Syrian Christians
Living people
People from Damascus